Qatar National Theater is located on the Doha Corniche, near Al Rumaila Garden in Doha, Qatar. The 490-seat theatre opened in 1986 and hosts concerts and plays. In addition to hosting local troupes, it also hosts international and Arab theatrical troupes on occasion.

It is owned by the Ministry of Culture, Arts and Heritage. At its inception in 1982, it featured computerized lighting systems, translation facilities and an orchestra pit.

Events hosted
The theatre hosted the 2013 edition of the Arab Theatre Festival after Qatar won the hosting rights for the first time in the event's history.

In 2015, Qatar Tourism Authority organized the Eid Al Adha Festival, as part of which The Wrestler, an Arabic play with actors Nasser Mohammad and Najwa Al Kubeisi was staged at the Qatar National Theater.

See also
Theatre in Qatar

References

External link
Events at Qatar National Theater by Type of Event, Data.gov.qa

Theatres in Qatar
Theatres completed in 1982
1982 establishments in Qatar